High Tension is a bilingual reality show in Marathi and Bengali languages.

Description

A reality quiz show in Marathi and Bengali languages. Marathi Version of High Tension was hosted by famous Actor Atul Kulkarni while Bengali version was hosted  by Shayan Munshi.

According to ETV, it's a different game show wherein three participants will compete at a time going through 5 rounds, facing 42 questions. The final winner has a chance of winning a maximum of Rupees Seven lakhs sixty three thousand.

Crew
 Director:- Gyan sahay
 Producer:- Prasad Devineni
 Production:- Arka Media Works

References

Arka Mediaworks Official Site , Official Work On Web , 24 June 2011

Indian game shows
Indian reality television series
Indian television series
Television game shows with incorrect disambiguation